The Prior of Perth was the head of Perth Charterhouse, the Carthusian monastic house located near Perth. It was founded in 1429, and finally suppressed in 1602. The following is a list of priors and prior-commendators:

List of priors and prior-commendators

List of priors
 Oswald de Corda, 1429-1434
 Adam Hangleside, 1434 x 1435-1441
 Laurence Hutton, 1442-1443
 Patrick Russell, 1443
 Michael Virey, 1444-1445
 Bryce Montgomery, 1445-1446
 Bryce Wych, 1446-1447
 Maurice Barry, 1447-1452
 Martin de Groether, 1452-1455
 James Bayne, 1456-1457
 Simon Fairlie, 1457-1465 x 1466
 Andrew Telfer, 1466-1471 x 1472
 Patrick Russell, 1472-1474 x 1475
 John Davidson, 1474 x 1475-1482 x 1486
 Richard Gaergen, 1482 x 1486
 David Simson, 1482 x 1486-1490 x 1492
 Walter Lyall, 1492-1495 x 1498
 John Ramsay, 1495 x 1498-1500 x 1501
 Alan (probably Alan Dawson), 1500 x 1501-1506 x 1507
 William Turnbull, 1507-1515 x 1517
 Hugh Moryn, 1515 x 1517-1535
 Alexander Inglis, 1535-1542 x 1543
 James Gordon, 1543-1543 x 1544
 Simon Galloway, 1543 x 1544-1544 x 1546
 Andrew Forman, 1544 x 1546-1552 x 1556
 Simon Galloway (again), 1550-1554 x
 Adam Forman, 1552 x 1556-1567
 Adam Stewart, 1567 x 1569-1569

List of commendator-priors
 George Balfour, 1569-1588
 James Balfour of Cossertoun, 1588-1592 x 1599
 George Hay of Nether Liff, 1599-1602

Notes

Bibliography
 Cowan, Ian B. & Easson, David E., Medieval Religious Houses: Scotland With an Appendix on the Houses in the Isle of Man, Second edition, (London, 1976), pp. 86-7
 Watt, D. E. R. & Shead, N. F. (eds.), The Heads of Religious Houses in Scotland from the 12th to the 16th Centuries, The Scottish Records Society, New Series, Volume 24, (Edinburgh, 2001), pp. 174-7

Carthusians
History of Perth, Scotland
People associated with Perth and Kinross
Religion in Perth and Kinross
Scottish priors